William Cecil, 2nd Earl of Exeter,  (1566 – 6 July 1640), known as the third Lord Burghley from 1605 to 1623, was an English nobleman, politician, and peer.

Life

Exeter was the son of Thomas Cecil, 1st Earl of Exeter, and Dorothy Neville, daughter of John Neville, 4th Baron Latimer.
He was educated at Trinity College, Cambridge, and travelled on the continent before being admitted to Gray's Inn.

In 1586, when only 20 years of age, he was returned to Parliament as MP for Stamford and was returned again in 1589. In 1597, he was elected knight of the shire for Rutland. He was invested as a Knight Bachelor in 1603. He held the office of Lord-Lieutenant of Northamptonshire between 1623 and 1640. He succeeded to the title of 3rd Baron of Burghley, co. Northampton [E., 1571] on 8 February 1622/23. He succeeded to the title of 2nd Earl of Exeter [E., 1605] on 8 February 1622/23. He was invested as a Privy Counsellor (PC) in 1626. He was invested as a Knight of the Order of the Garter (KG) in 1630.

In 1589, William married Elizabeth Manners, the only child of Edward Manners, 3rd Earl of Rutland, and they had one child, William Cecil, 16th Baron Ros 

Elizabeth died in 1591 and William married Elizabeth Drury, daughter of Sir William Drury and Elizabeth Stafford, and they had three children:
 Lady Anne Cecil married Henry Grey, 1st Earl of Stamford, and had issue.
 Lady Elizabeth Cecil (d. 1672), married Thomas Howard, 1st Earl of Berkshire, and had issue.
 Lady Diana Cecil (d. 1658), married Henry de Vere, 18th Earl of Oxford, no issue, remarried Thomas Bruce, 1st Earl of Elgin, also with no issue.

References

|-

1566 births
1640 deaths
Barons Burghley
Alumni of Trinity College, Cambridge
Members of Gray's Inn
William Cecil, 2nd Earl of Exeter
Earls of Exeter
Knights of the Garter
Members of the Privy Council of Great Britain
Lord-Lieutenants of Northamptonshire
English MPs 1586–1587
English MPs 1589
English MPs 1597–1598
16th-century English nobility
17th-century English nobility